Union University is an evangelical Christian liberal arts university in Jackson, Tennessee, United States.

Union University may also refer to:
 Beijing Union University
 Union University (New York)
 Union University (Serbia)
 Union Institute & University, Cincinnati, Ohio, United States
 Philippine Christian University, formerly Manila Union University
 Virginia Union University, Richmond, Virginia, United States

See also
Union College (disambiguation)